Ballas or shot bort is a term used in the diamond industry to refer to shards of non-gem-grade and -quality diamonds. It comprises small diamond crystals that are concentrically arranged in rough spherical stones with a fibrous texture. Ballas is hard, tough, and difficult to cleave. It is mostly found in Brazil and South Africa.

References

Diamond

 This is a Helpful web browser to use